Abdoujaparov are a punk band formed on 19 October 1998 by ex-Carter USM guitarist Les Carter (aka Fruitbat). Abdoujaparov's musical foundation is in 1977 punk rock.

Eight EPs, two singles and four albums have been released so far. A compilation CD featuring tracks from the first 3 EPs was released by Pop Gun in Australia. The band has toured the UK, Germany, Australia and America.

Les and guitarist Richy Crockford have also recorded and toured under the name iDou, which consists of the two playing guitars over a backing track supplied by an iPod Shuffle.

The band composed the song Pop Pop Pop for the 2004 video game Airburst Extreme. and Les and Richy wrote the music featured in the Xbox live arcade game TotemBall.

The band is named after a professional cyclist Djamolidine Abdoujaparov, from Uzbekistan.

Discography
Albums
Air Odeon Disco Pub (2002)
Cycle Riot History Gang (2007)
Seaside Arcade Bingo Patrol (2014)
Race Home Grow Love (2021)

EPs
Punk Confetti (1998)
Maria's Umbrella (1999)
Baby Food (1999)
Just Shut Up! (2000)
Emergency Medical Hologram (2001)
Well Oiled (2003)
Ultra Cool (2005)
Uncle Fruity (2013)

Singles
Murder (on Dalberg Rd)
Emergency Medical Hologram (2001)

Misc
Djamolidine (1999)
Live at the Astoria (2002)
Free Bonus CD (2002)
Cycle Riot History Gang Bonus Disk (2007)
Rock Space Bingo Beaver (2014)

iDou
Perfect Hands (2006)

References

External links
Carter USM family
Abdoujaparov homepage

English punk rock groups
Carter the Unstoppable Sex Machine